Tagundaing refers to an ornamented victory column or flagstaff, typically , found within the grounds of Burmese Buddhist pagodas and kyaungs (monasteries). These ornamented columns were raised within religious compounds to celebrate the submission of nats (local animistic spirits) to the Dhamma, the Buddhist doctrine and inspired by the Pillars of Ashoka.

A mythical hintha (or more rarely a kinnara) is generally found perching atop the column, while the base of the column may be decorated with Thagyamin. Vasudhara, the earth goddess, may also be found at the base.

Examples

See also

 Ancient iron production
 Ashoka's Major Rock Edicts
 Dhar iron pillar
 Hindu temple architecture
 History of metallurgy in South Asia
 Iron pillar of Delhi
 List of Edicts of Ashoka 
 Pillars of Ashoka
 Stambha

References

See also

Pillars of Ashoka
Lak Mueang

Burmese Buddhist architecture
Monumental columns